Thomas Daniel Jennings (born 1955) is a Los Angeles-based artist, known for his work on FidoNet and for his work at Phoenix Software on MS-DOS integration and interoperability.

Work
He is the creator of FidoNet, the first message and file networking system for BBSes. Originally, the FidoNet protocols were implemented in a program named Fido, authored by Jennings, but they were ultimately implemented by other authors in other software to create a network using a multiplicity of platforms.

Aside from creating the most influential protocol for networking computer bulletin boards, Jennings built Wired magazine's first internet presence, wrote the portable BIOS that led to Phoenix Technologies BIOS, ran an early regional internet service provider, The Little Garden (later incorporated as TLGnet, Inc), and maintains an informal archive of Cold War science and technology.

While he lived in San Francisco, from 1988 until 1991 Jennings was the publisher and co-editor, with Deke Nihilson, of Homocore, one of the earliest Queercore zines. The name came from the pages of J.D.s zine, and featured musicians and writers such as The Apostles, Steve Abbott, Donna Dresch, Larry Livermore, Daniel Nicoletta and G.B. Jones.  The editors' other activities, such as organizing Homocore shows where bands such as Fugazi and Beat Happening appeared, and writing for and creating other publications, were instrumental in popularizing the Queercore movement, particularly on the west coast. (Deke also performed in films, such as The Yo-Yo Gang, and had his own Queercore band Comrade in Arms.) Internationally, Homocore zine, throughout its eight (including the rarely seen issue #5-1/2) issues, along with J.D.s, was influential in the rise of Queercore as the zines found their way into the hands of queer punk kids across North America, South America and Europe.

Personal life

Jennings currently resides in Los Angeles, California with his partner Josh Stehlik.

References

External links 
 SR - IX Website of Tom Jennings
 Rambler Lore Website of American Motors/AMC/Rambler automobile technical lore (practices) and documentation
 World Power Systems (older Website of Tom Jennings)
 Photo gallery of Tom Jennings from BBS: The Documentary
 
 Arts Computation Engineering UCI Graduate Program
"The Anarchist", by Paulina Borsook. Wired.com. (Issue 4.04. April 1996)

1955 births
Living people
Queercore
FidoNet
University of California, Irvine people
LGBT people from California
LGBT people from Massachusetts
People from Boston
People from Los Angeles
Internet pioneers